The Copa Libertadores 1984 was the 25th edition of the Copa Libertadores, CONMEBOL's annual international club tournament. Independiente won the competition.

Group stage

Group 1

Group 2

Group 3

Group 4

Group 5

Semifinals

Group 1

Group 2

Finals

|}

External links

 Libertadores 1984 at RSSSF.com

1
Copa Libertadores seasons